The 2009–10 season was Southend United's 104th season in existence and their third consecutive season in League One. Along with competing in League One, the club also participated in the FA Cup, Football League Cup and Football League Trophy. Southend were relegated from League One, having finished 23rd, whilst they were eliminated from the FA Cup in the first round, and from the League Cup and Football League Trophy in the second. The season covers the period from 1 July 2009 to 30 June 2010.

Season summary

First-team squad
Players' ages as of 8 May 2010.

Competitions

League One

League table

FA Cup

Football League Cup

Football League Trophy

Player statistics

Appearances and goals

References

Southend United F.C. seasons
Southend United